night, Mother is a 1986 American drama film starring Sissy Spacek and Anne Bancroft. It was directed by Tom Moore and written by Marsha Norman, based on Norman's Pulitzer Prize-winning play of the same name. The film was entered into the 37th Berlin International Film Festival. Tom Moore had also directed the play on Broadway.

Plot
Jessie is a middle-aged woman living with her widowed mother, Thelma. One night, Jessie calmly tells her mother that she plans to commit suicide that very evening. Jessie makes this revelation all while nonchalantly organizing household items and preparing to do her mother's nails.

The resulting intense conversation between Jessie and Thelma reveals Jessie's reasons for her decision and how thoroughly she has planned her own death, culminating in a disturbing yet unavoidable climax.

Cast
Sissy Spacek as  Jessie Cates
Anne Bancroft as  Thelma Cates
Ed Berke as  Dawson Cates
Carol Robbins as  Loretta Cates
Jennifer Roosendahl as  Melodie Cates
Michael Kenworthy as  Kenny Cates
Sari Walker as  Agnes Fletcher
Claire Malis as  Operator (voice)

Release
night, Mother was released theatrically on September 12, 1986.

The film received mixed reviews, and Bancroft was nominated for the Golden Globe Award for Best Actress in a Motion Picture – Drama. Spacek was nominated for the Academy Award that year for Crimes of the Heart, another film adaptation of a play, released the same year.

The film was given its first-ever U.S. DVD release, by Universal Studios on August 3, 2010.

References

External links
 
 
 
 

1986 films
1986 drama films
American drama films
1980s English-language films
American films based on plays
Films about suicide
Films directed by Tom Moore
Universal Pictures films
Films about conversations
Films scored by David Shire
Films about mother–daughter relationships
1980s American films